Józef Piłsudski has been awarded numerous honours, domestic and foreign.

Polish National honours

National honours 

 Order of the White Eagle (1921)
Order of Virtuti Militari
 Knight's Cross
 Commander's Cross
 Grand Cross
 Cross of Independence with Swords (6 November 1930)
Order of Polonia Restituta
 Commander's Cross with Star
 Grand Cordon

Military honours 

 Cross of Valour (four times)
 Gold Cross of Merit (four times, including in 1931)
 Cross of Merit of the Central Lithuania Army
 Cross of Silesian Merit and Valor
 Officers' Badge "Parasol" (1912)
 Officers' Badge "For Faithful Service" (1916)
Cross Kaniowski (1929)

Other honours 

 Scouting Cross (1920)
 "Gold trade union" Chief Fire Brigades Union [78]
 Badge "Józef Piłsudski Polish Legion Commander" (1916) [80]
 Commemorative Badge of former prisoners from the years 1914–1921 Ideological (1928) [81]

Foreign honours 

:
 Order of the Iron Crown Class III (Austria-Hungary)

 Grand Cross of the Order of Leopold

 Order of Saint Alexander with Swords

 Grand Collar of the Order of the Southern Cross Class

 Czechoslovak War Cross 1918

 Order of the Cross of the Eagle, Class I (Estonia, 1930)
Cross of Liberty
 Grade I
 Grade III

 Grand Cross of the White Rose of Finland with Collar

 Grand Cross of the Legion of Honour, No. 25864 (continuous numbering) and the Médaille militaire

 Grand Cross – Yellow Decoration of the Order of Military Merit

 Grand Cordon of the Order of the Rising Sun

 Order of the Karađorđe's Star

 Order of Lāčplēsis, Class I

 Bailiff Knight Grand Cross of Honour and Devotion Sovereign Military Order of St. John of Jerusalem, Class IV

 Grand Cross of the Order of the Tower and Sword

 Collar of the Order of Carol I
 Order of Michael the Brave, Classes I, II and III (Romania)

 Grand Cross of Merit

 Knight Grand Cross of the Order of Saints Maurice and Lazarus
 Knight Grand Cross of the Military Order of Savoy

Honorary doctorates 
 Jagiellonian University (28 April 1920) [102]
 Adam Mickiewicz University (11 November 1933)
 University of Warsaw (2 May 1921) [103]
 Stefan Batory University in Vilnius (September 1921)

References

Józef Piłsudski
Piłsudski, Józef